Neftekumsky District is an administrative district (raion), one of the twenty-six in Stavropol Krai, Russia. Municipally, it is incorporated as Neftekumsky Municipal District. It is located in the east of the krai. Its administrative center is the town of Neftekumsk. Population:  70,902 (2002 Census); 59,775 (1989 Census). The population of Neftekumsk accounts for 40.3% of the district's total population.

References

Notes

Sources

Districts of Stavropol Krai